Big Red is the mascot of the Arizona Cardinals of the NFL.  According to his official biography, he "hatched" on October 4, 1998.  He's also 6 foot 4 inches, has a 7-foot wingspan.

He is one of the most recognizable mascots because of his appearance. He is at every home game, and became their mascot on October 4, 1998. 

Big Red has also appeared at Super Bowl XLIII, on February 4, 2009, when the Cardinals went against the eventual champions, the Pittsburgh Steelers.

Big Red has made a appearance at Papago School (located in Phoenix, Arizona 2013 N 36th St, Phoenix, AZ 85008) today at March 2, 2023.

External links
Official Arizona Cardinals Mascot Page

National Football League mascots
Arizona Cardinals
Bird mascots